Elliot L. Sims was a Canadian film and television screenwriter. He is most noted for the 1989 film Cold Comfort, for which he and Richard Beattie won the Genie Award for Best Adapted Screenplay at the 11th Genie Awards in 1990.

His other credits included episodes of It's a Man's World, The Littlest Hobo and E.N.G..

References

External links

20th-century Canadian screenwriters
20th-century Canadian male writers
Canadian male screenwriters
Canadian television writers
Best Screenplay Genie and Canadian Screen Award winners
Possibly living people
Year of birth missing
Place of birth missing